ESPN National Hockey Night is a video game developed and published by Konami for PlayStation 2 and Game Boy Color in 2001.

Reception

The PS2 version received "generally unfavorable reviews" according to the review aggregation website Metacritic. Dan Egger of NextGen said that the game "isn't irredeemable; it's certainly better than FaceOff, but it's just nowhere near as good as EA Sports' NHL Hockey either." In Japan, Famitsu gave it a score of 29 out of 40.

References

External links
 

2001 video games
ESPN National Hockey League video games
ESPN video games
Game Boy Color games
Konami games
National Hockey League video games
PlayStation 2 games
Video games developed in Japan
Video games set in 2002